Phryxe is a genus of flies in the family Tachinidae.

Species
Phryxe caudata (Rondani, 1859)
Phryxe erythrostoma (Hartig, 1838)
Phryxe heraclei (Meigen, 1824)
Phryxe hirta (Bigot, 1880)
Phryxe magnicornis (Zetterstedt, 1838)
Phryxe nemea (Meigen, 1824)
Phryxe patruelis Mesnil, 1953.
Phryxe pecosensis (Townsend, 1926)
Phryxe prima (Brauer & von Bergenstamm, 1889)
Phryxe semicaudata Herting, 1959
Phryxe setifacies (Villeneuve, 1910)
Phryxe tenebrata Herting, 1977
Phryxe tolucana Reinhard, 1956
Phryxe unicolor (Villeneuve, 1908)
Phryxe vulgaris (Fallén, 1810)

References

Diptera of Europe
Diptera of Asia
Diptera of North America
Exoristinae
Tachinidae genera
Taxa named by Jean-Baptiste Robineau-Desvoidy